The Gregory Brothers are an American musical quartet, specializing in comedy music and pitch correction through their YouTube channel Schmoyoho. After the success of their songs 'Chrissy Wake Up' and 'It's Corn' in the summer of 2022, NPR reported that that they "are responsible for some of the biggest viral songs of the past decade."

They are best known for their creation of musical viral videos, most notably the "Winning" song that won a 2012 Comedy Award, their Songify the News series (formerly known as Auto-Tune the News), and the "Bed Intruder Song" that received over 141 million YouTube views and entered the Billboard Hot 100. Their recent releases, "Who's It Gonna Be?" with Weird Al Yankovic and "The Last Fight" with Joseph Gordon-Levitt, parodied the two US presidential debates of 2020.

The three Gregory brothers – drummer/keyboardist Michael, guitarist/bassist Andrew Rose and keyboardist Evan – originally from Radford, Virginia, moved to Brooklyn, New York in the mid-2000s and met guitarist/bassist Sarah Fullen (who married Evan in 2009) in the local music scene. The band was formed in 2007, with all four members providing vocals, often accompanying "songified" individuals.

After 10 years of activity, having earned the most views by songifying the likes of Antoine Dodson, Charlie Sheen, Paul Vasquez and Daymon Patterson, their Schmoyoho channel reached three million subscribers in March 2017. In commemoration, the Gregory Brothers released a "mega-mashup" of their work, in which they outlined their main goal of eliciting "the maximum amount of happiness for the maximum amount of time".

Viral videos

The Gregory Brothers (using the YouTube username 'schmoyoho') first became well known for a series of YouTube videos, Auto-Tune the News (rebranded in 2011 as Songify the News), in which recorded voices of politicians, news anchors, and political pundits were digitally manipulated to conform to a melody, making the figures appear to sing.

National television networks featured the Gregory Brothers' early political satires in the spring of 2009, but the group did not achieve mainstream recognition until the summer of 2010, when they released episode 12b of Auto-Tune the News, titled "Bed Intruder Song," which featured excerpts from an interview with alleged crime victims Kelly Dodson and her brother, Antoine Dodson, was viewed approximately 50 million times during its first six months online, making it the most-viewed YouTube video of 2010 (excluding major label music videos), and currently has more than 150 million views.

Largely non-political in content, it marked a departure from the Gregory Brothers' roots in political material. Following the mainstream success of that music video, the Gregory Brothers have generally produced a mixture of both political and non-political videos.

The band is best known for the Auto-Tune and Songify series, they have created several additional videos, independent of that series, which have received broad attention. The following videos are part of their first season of Auto-Tune the News for 16 episodes.

More than 200 Million views 
"THE MUFFIN SONG (asdfmovie feat. Schmoyoho)" (210+ million views)
More than 100 Million views 
"Songify This - Bed Intruder Song" (148+ million views)
"All The Way - Jacksepticeye Songify Remix by Schmoyoho" (100+ million views) 
More than 50 million views
"Jabba the Hutt - sung by PewDiePie" (61+ million views)
"Songify This - Winning - A Song by Charlie Sheen" (65+ million views)
More than 30 million views
"Songify This - DOUBLE RAINBOW SONG!!" (41+ million views)
"Songify This - Can't Hug Every Cat - a song about loving cats" (39+ millions views)
"Songify This - Oh My Dayum" (36+ million views)
"Songify This - Dead Giveaway!" (35+ million views)
"MY SIDE - OFFICIAL SONG (LAURDIY + ALEX WASSABI)" (32+ million views)
"Space is Cool - Markiplier Songify Remix by Schmoyoho" (30+ million views)
More than 10 million views
"Chicken Attack // Song Voyage // Japan // ft. Takeo Ischi" (24+ million views) 
"Titenic: The JonSong - sung by JonTron" (17+ million views) 
"I'm A Pretty Girl - sung by PewDiePie” (13+ million Views)
"TAKIN MY BABY! *OFFICIAL SONG* (ALEX WASSABI + LAURDIY)" (14+ million views)
"Songify This - Auto-Tune Cute Kids and Kanye" (12+ million views)
"Songify This - Backin Up Song" (12+ million views)
"Songify This - Obama Sings to the Shawties" (11+ million views)
"Sunny D and Rum (The =3 Musical)" (14+ million views) 
"Celebration Time - Jelly Songify by Schmoyoho" (11+ million views)
"smash, Smash, SMASH!" (10+ million views)
"JUST DO IT!!! ft. Shia LaBeouf - Songify This" (10+ million views)
"Songify This - Reality Hits You Hard Bro" (10+ million views)
"WHAT IS MY LIFE - Jacksepticeye Songify Remix by Schmoyoho" (10+ million views)
"BAD HOMBRES, NASTY WOMEN" ft. Weird Al Yankovic (10+ million views)
More than 5 million views
"Songify This - MOMMY & DADDY SONG!" (9+ million views)
"Rent: Too Damn High! Song." (9+ million views)
"Songify This - GINGERS HAVE SOULS" (9+ million views)
"Chrissy, Wake Up - Stranger Things," (9+ million views)
"Songify This - SunnyD and Rum - THE POP SINGLE!" (7+ million views)
"Songify This - CHUCK TESTA - a song about lifelike dead animals." (7+ million views) this 
"Songify This - Strut That Ass Song" (6+ million views)
"Songify This - BEST NASCAR PRAYER EVER - in song" (6+ million views)
"Songify This - I'M NOT A WITCH - sung by Christine O'Donnell" (5+ million views)
Get Money, Turn Gay - Songify the News #1 (5+ million views)
Auto-Tune the News #10: Turtles (5+ million views)
"Obama Mixtape: 1999 - Songify the News Special" (5+ million views)
"We're All Doomed" feat. Weird Al Yankovic (5+ million views)
More than 3 million views
"FLY LIKE A BUTTERFLY - Markiplier Songify Remix by SCHMOYOHO" (4+ million views)
"Songify This - TORNADO SONG!! - look at the tree" (4+ million views)
FINAL DEBATE SONGIFIED (4+ million views)
Songify This - BELIEVE IN YOURSELF." 
Debate Highlights Songified! 
Songify This - Poke Me - Amir sings his plea"
Why, Why, Manti? 
Town Hall Debate Songified 
VP Debate Highlights Songified 
Songify This - Sanity Song 
Songify This - 'Fast Don't Lie' Remix - feat. Slim Chin, Dwight Howard, & D. Rose" 
I Don't Wanna Be Free UNPLUGED - Mark's Version (from A Heist With Markiplier)

The Gregory Brothers began to retroactively apply the series name "Songify This" to certain previously series-independent videos in late 2010, and they have released a number of new videos under this branding as well. The table above reflects the new "Songify This" branding where applicable.

In 2022, they attracted media attention when their Stranger Things parody "Chrissy Wake Up" and their remix of a Recess Therapy interview with a boy who described corn as "a big lump with knobs", called "It's Corn" both became major TikTok trends.

83rd Annual Academy Awards

The Gregory Brothers created a musical segment for the 83rd Academy Awards where they auto-tuned bits of 4 major motion pictures from 2010: Harry Potter and the Deathly Hallows – Part 1, Toy Story 3, The Social Network, and The Twilight Saga: Eclipse.

Host James Franco comically introduced the segment as a tribute to a "great year for the movie musical." Characters who were autotuned included Ron Weasley, Hermione Granger, Sheriff Woody, Sean Parker, and Edward Cullen. On July 14, 2011, it was announced that this segment earned The Gregory Brothers a nomination for a 2011 Emmy award in the category "Outstanding Short-Form Picture Editing." Only Michael and Evan are nominated as there is a two-person nomination limit in this category.

While only those four aired, an alternative cut was released on the official 2011 Grammy Awards YouTube channel on February 27, 2011, featuring an auto-tuned version of The King's Speech in place of The Social Network.

"Double Rainbow Song"
In July 2010, the Gregory Brothers released an auto-tuned version of the Double Rainbow viral video. The original video featured the overawed reaction of Paul "Hungry Bear" Vasquez to a double rainbow at Yosemite National Park. The Gregory Brothers turned Vasquez's astounded speech into a song and pledged all of the song's earnings to Vasquez and Yosemite.

As of June 24, 2022, the Gregory Brothers' remix had received over 41 million views.

Punch Up the Jam podcast 
In December 2021, Andrew Gregory announced that The Gregory Brothers would be taking over the podcast Punch Up the Jam from the network Headgum.

Musical collaborations

The Gregory Brothers appear as members of the Welcome Wagon Choir on The Welcome Wagon's 2009 debut album Welcome to the Welcome Wagon, produced by Sufjan Stevens. The Welcome Wagon is a project headed by Presbyterian minister Vito Aiuto and his wife, Monique.

The Gregory Brothers often perform live with Sarah Gregory's band The Stanleys. The group was commissioned to produce the theme song for the Netflix series Unbreakable Kimmy Schmidt, which was based on their "Bed Intruder Song".

Song Voyage
Song Voyage (a play-on-words on "bon voyage") is a The Station web series starring the four Gregory Brothers, who are also co-creators and co-producers along with Portal A Interactive. Directed by Dan Eckman, the comedy travel series features the Gregory Brothers visiting nations in the Asia-Pacific region and collaborating with local musicians to create original novelty songs. It has been described as "a musical twist on an Anthony Bourdain show." The series premiered on Sling TV, after which episodes began being released on the Gregory Brothers' second YouTube channel in December 2016, while music videos from within each episode were also released on the main Schmoyoho channel.

Members
 Evan Gregory (born 1978 or 1979) – vocals, piano, keyboards, percussion 
 Sarah Fullen Gregory (born 1981 or 1982) – vocals, guitars, mandolin, ukulele, bass, percussion 
 Andrew Rose Gregory (born 1981 or 1982) – vocals, guitars, bass, ukulele, percussion 
 Michael Gregory (born 1984 or 1985) – vocals, keyboards, drums, ukulele, percussion

Discography

Meet the Gregory Brothers!
The group released their first EP, Meet the Gregory Brothers!, on May 29, 2009. Village Voice music writer Ben Westhoff characterized the effort as "a lounge-y, refreshingly sincere slice of blue-eyed soul", and Jake Frazier of PopSense praised the work, claiming that it "[brought] more to the table than the other 1000+ songs [in his music library]". Westhoff opined that "unfortunately, many of the Brothers' new fans have no patience for anything that's not Auto-Tune the News", though the group itself takes a broader view of its fans' tastes, believing that "there will definitely be some fans who found us through our videos, and who will be disappointed when they hear our records and they're not a bunch of hip-hop political parodies…[but] most people get that we are capable of creating music in different styles, and can appreciate our folky soul jams for what they are."

For the period of July 15–22 2009, 47–54 days after its release, the EP was ranked as the top-selling album on Amie Street in the category of "Soul / R&B".

Contributing musicians on the album include Doug Hulin (bass) and Justin Keller (saxophone). The album was recorded at the Mission Sound Recording facility in Brooklyn, New York, and was produced, engineered, and mixed by Zach McNees. The recording was mastered by Ricardo Gutierrez. The cover art photographer was Denny Renshaw, and Morgan King, founder of Yer Bird Records, is credited with its design.

Songify the Election
While many of the Gregory Brothers' Songify singles are published through YouTube, their music videos of candidates during United States presidential elections were also released as albums in 2012 and 2016. These were created by songifying audio from presidential debates and media appearances. The Atlantics Kasia Cieplak-Mayr von Baldegg described the 2012 debate tracks as "surprisingly polished, if not as hilarious as their big hits." Noah Houghton of The Harvard Crimson applauded the quality and novelty of the 2016 album, adding that "the production on every song in the album is great without exception."

Happy Sad Songs
A series of covers of popular songs were arranged, performed and shared by the Gregory Brothers through Vine, Facebook and YouTube. Somewhat uniquely, these covers switched the key of the song between major and minor, giving otherwise happy songs a melancholy tone while sad songs sounded more joyful. In March 2014, and again in September 2016, the Gregory Brothers released compilation albums of some such covers.

Love Is Like Drugs
In November 2016, the Gregory Brothers collaborated with Jon Jafari (aka JonTron) and created a comedy album entitled Love Is Like Drugs. The album managed to reach number two on the Billboard chart of comedy albums of the week of November 26.

Sleigh Ride / Fireside
A Christmas album, featuring original music and upbeat covers of popular Christmas and winter songs performed by The Gregory Brothers, debuted on November 15, 2018.  The album was released in both standard and deluxe editions.  A public livestream of The Gregory Brothers performing the album premiered on December 6, 2018.

Other albums

Andrew Rose Gregory solo albums
(2005) Andrew Gregory
(2007) The Lost Year
(2008) The Color Red & Other Songs About The Power of Love
(2009) The Paramedic & Other Songs About Birds
(2011) The Song of Songs (with The Color Red Band) 
 (2012) The Covers EP (with The Color Red Band)
 (2022) Sketched Twice

Michael Gregory contributing albums
(2008) Kapluckus: Endless Space

References

External links

The Gregory Brothers' official website

; contains the Songify the News videos

Songify the News official episode listing on YouTube
C-SPAN Q&A interview with Evan and Michael Gregory about Auto-Tune the News, April 11, 2010

Musical groups from New York (state)
American soul musical groups
American comedy musical groups
Musical groups established in 2007
YouTube channels launched in 2006
Viral videos
American YouTubers
People from Radford, Virginia
American Internet groups